Antoine Crozat, Marquis du Châtel (c. 1655 – 7 June 1738), French founder of an immense fortune, was the first proprietary owner of French Louisiana, from 1712 to 1717.

Career
Antoine Crozat and his brother Pierre Crozat were born in Toulouse, France, the sons of a wealthy banking family. They moved to Paris around 1700 and rose from obscurity to become two of the wealthiest financiers of France. By way of lending money to the government, Antoine was ennobled as the Marquis du Châtel, a title he transmitted to his eldest son Louis-François. He became a financial counselor to Louis XIV. He invested in the Guinea Company and the Asiento Company, two lucrative overseas franchises involved in the slave trade. The king eventually offered him a 15‑year trade monopoly in Louisiana. Crozat's term running and influencing Louisiana was quite unpopular with the settlers, and Crozat ceded the monopoly only 5 years into the 15 year term.  As Crozat left, he claimed that tobacco could be grown in Louisiana.  The monopoly was transferred to the Scottish economist and businessman John Law in 1717 under a group called The Company of the West (Compagnie d'Occident).

Personal life

In 1690 Antoine Crozat married Marguerite Legendre (1670–1742). They had four children:
 Louis-François Crozat, Marquis du Châtel (1691–1750), who inherited his uncle Pierre's collection of paintings and his hôtel in the Rue de Richelieu
 Marie Anne (1695–1729), who married the comte d'Évreux, Louis Henri de La Tour d'Auvergne, son of Godefroy Maurice de La Tour d'Auvergne and Marie Anne Mancini
 Joseph-Antoine Crozat, Marquis de Thugny (1696–1751)
 Louis-Antoine Crozat, Baron de Thiers (1699-1770), whose collection of paintings, inherited from his eldest brother Louis-François and his other brother Joseph-Antoine (mostly Dutch pictures), was purchased after his death for the collection of Catherine II of Russia, through Denis Diderot. Most now hang in the Hermitage Museum in Saint Petersburg, although a few were sold in the 1920s and 1930s by the Soviet authorities for hard currency, including a dozen purchased by Andrew Mellon, now in the National Gallery of Art in Washington, DC.

In 1708 Antoine Crozat built a notable hôtel particulier on the Place Vendôme to the designs of the architect Pierre Bullet. It became part of the Hôtel Ritz Paris in 1910.

Notes

Bibliography
 Gady, Alexandre (2008). Les Hôtels particuliers de Paris du Moyen Âge à la Belle Époque. Paris: Parigramme. .
 Leclair, Anne (1996). "Crozat family", vol. 8. pp. 208–210, in The Dictionary of Art (34 vols.), edited by Jane Turner. New York: Grove. . Also at Oxford Art Online, subscription required.

People of Louisiana (New France)
1650s births
1738 deaths
Businesspeople from Toulouse
Occitan people
People of New France
18th-century French businesspeople
17th-century French businesspeople